Franklin Magtunao Drilon (born November 28, 1945) is a Filipino lawyer and former politician. He had the longest tenure in the Senate of the Philippines (tied with Lorenzo Tañada and  Tito Sotto), having served four non-consecutive terms overall: from 1995 to 2007 and 2010 to 2022. He has served thrice as president of the Senate: in 2000, from 2001 to 2006, and from 2013 to 2016. 

Having also served as Senate president pro tempore, Senate Majority Leader, and Senate Minority Leader, he is the only senator to have held all four of the Senate's major leadership positions. A member of the Liberal Party since 2003, he has been the party's vice-chairman since 2011 and has previously served as the party's chairman and president.

He also served as Secretary of Labor and Employment, Secretary of Justice, and Executive Secretary in the administration of President Corazon Aquino. He became Secretary of Justice again during the administration of President Fidel V. Ramos.

Drilon was born and raised in Iloilo City and studied law at the University of the Philippines. He placed third in the 1969 Bar Exams and worked as a private practice lawyer before joining the government.

Early life
Drilon was born on November 28, 1945, in Iloilo City, Iloilo and is the eldest son of Cesar Drilon Sr. and Primitiva Magtunao. He took his elementary education at the Baluarte Elementary School in Molo, Iloilo City, and graduated in 1957. He finished his secondary education at the U.P. - Iloilo College (now University of the Philippines High School in Iloilo) in 1961.

In college, he went to the University of the Philippines Diliman (U.P.) where he received his Bachelor of Arts Political Science degree in 1965. At U.P., he was the associate editor of the student newspaper Philippine Collegian and served as councilor of the U.P. Student Council. Among his classmates were future politicians Miriam Defensor Santiago and Ronaldo Zamora. In 1969, he completed his Bachelor of Laws (LL.B) at the University of the Philippines College of Law in UP Diliman. He placed 3rd in the 1969 Philippine Bar Examinations with an 86.85% bar rating.

In the same year, he served as an associate lawyer of Sycip, Salazar, Luna, Manalo & Feliciano Law Offices (now SyCip Salazar Hernandez & Gatmaitan). He moved to Angara, Abello, Concepcion, Regala & Cruz Law Offices (ACCRALaw) in 1974, where he still serves as Senior Counsel. ACCRALaw elevated him to partner in 1975, co-managing partner in 1981 and managing partner in 1986.

Drilon was also a Bar Examiner on Labor and Social Legislation in the 1979 and 1984 bar examinations. He also became the vice-president and governor of the Employers Confederation of the Philippines (ECOP) and the vice-president, Board member and treasurer of the Personnel Management Association of the Philippines (PMAP).

Political career
Drilon served the government and public corporations through the following positions:
Department of Justice
Secretary, (1990–1991; 1992–1995)
Chairman, Board of Pardons and Parole
Member, Judicial and Bar Council (JBC)
Member, National Unification Commission
Chairman, Presidential Committee on Human Rights (PCHR)
Executive Secretary (1991–1992)
Chairman, Cabinet Cluster on Political & Security Matters (Cluster "E")
Member, National Security Council (NSC)
Vice-chairman, Committee on Privatization (COP)
Member, Joint Legislative-Executive Foreign Debt Council
Department of Labor and Employment
Secretary,  (1987–1990)
Deputy Minister for Industrial Relations, Department of Labor and Employment (1986–1987)
Member, Presidential Agrarian Reform Council (PARC)
Commissioner, Social Security Commission
Chairman, National Labor Relations Commission
Chairman, Philippine Overseas Employment Administration
Chairman, Overseas Workers Welfare Administration
Chairman, Employee Compensation Commission
Trustee, Home Development Mutual Fund (Pag-IBIG Fund)
Board Member, National Housing Authority
Chairman, National Manpower and Youth Council
Chairman, National Wages Council
Chairman, National Maritime Polytechnic
Vice-chairman, Public Sector Labor-Management Council
Chairman, Philippine National Bank (PNB)
Director, Philippine Air Lines (PAL)
Director, Land Bank of the Philippines
Board Member, Philippine Crop Insurance Corporation
Board Member, Population Commission
Cabinet Officer for Regional Development (CORD) of Region VI

Cory Aquino cabinet
As Justice Secretary, Drilon was instrumental in the prosecution and conviction of Mayor Antonio Sanchez of Calauan, Laguna, who masterminded the rape-slaying of a UP Los Baños coed and the murder of his friend; and Claudio Teehankee Jr., who was figured in the gun slaying of Maureen Hultman. Both cases ended up in convictions.

Senate

In 1992, most of the Aquino cabinet were drafted for the Senate candidate line-up of the newly created party, Lakas Tao; Drilon opted to help President Aquino finish her term. He was again given the opportunity to run as a senatorial candidate of the Lakas–Laban coalition in the 1995 election. He got the fourth highest number of votes in that Senate race. In 1998, he bolted Lakas and joined the Laban ng Makabayang Masang Pilipino (LAMMP) and supported Joseph Estrada in the presidency contest. He was selected as Senate Majority Floor Leader the same year. In 1999, he was among those who voted in favor of the ratification of the Visiting Forces Agreement.

When Marcelo Fernan died of cancer the same year, he made concessions with Blas Ople in sharing the seat of the Senate President. They agreed that Ople will serve as Senate President from 1999 to 2000 and he would serve from 2000 to 2001. Ople served his term from July 1999-July 2000. Drilon was installed as Senate President in July 2000.
In October 2000 he issued a statement about the Juetengate Scandal of President Joseph Estrada. He was removed the next month through a Senate revamp and Aquilino Pimentel Jr. was installed as Senate President (Drilon would also be succeeded by his son Aquilino Pimentel III as Senate President in 2016). In December 2000, an impeachment case was filed against President Estrada in the Senate. During the January 13, 2001 session of the impeachment proceedings, he was one of those who voted in favor of the opening of a mysterious second bank envelope. Their vote was outnumbered and Drilon was remembered as the Senator who cried in front of Senate President Pimentel together with Senator Loren Legarda, as impeachment lawyers walked out of the session hall in protest. Joseph Estrada was subsequently ousted that very evening by what would be remembered as the second EDSA People Power Revolution. Drilon allowed Pimentel to occupy the Senate presidency until the end of the regular session in June 2001.

When the session resumed in July 2001, Pimentel was replaced by Drilon as Senate President. Pimentel bolted the administration coalition and joined forces with the opposition coalition. In 2003, administration coalition partner Liberal Party, to which President Arroyo's father, Diosdado Macapagal, served as chairman in the 1960s, invited Drilon to be its member. Days later, Drilon was elected chairman of the political party. Before the 2004 elections, Drilon invited Senator Rodolfo Biazon to be a party member. Biazon bolted Raul Roco's Aksyon Demokratiko (AD) only days after he joined that party's convention to become the Liberal Party's new member.

Drilon had close contacts with President Gloria Macapagal Arroyo since 2001 and actively supported her when she ran for a fresh mandate to occupy the office of the President. That relationship ended on July 8, however, when Drilon---together with Biazon and some prominent members of the Liberal Party---decided to withdraw their support for her and asked for her resignation. In Arroyo's 2005 State of the Nation Address, Drilon was the only one noticed not applauding throughout the entire program. Drilon has been a vocal critic of the NorthRail project, a Chinese government-backed project to overhaul Manila's decrepit railway system. The railway was to be the first double-tracked railway in the country, and was expected to eventually extend to Clark in Pampanga and, according to the architects, as far north as San Fernando, La Union. During his second term as Senate President, Drilon spearheaded the Senate's confronting the excesses of the executive branch by authorizing the Senate standing committees to conduct inquiries in aid of legislation; he led the Chamber in opposing Executive Order No. 264, which prohibited members of the Cabinet from attending hearings of Congress, the Senate in particular, without permission from the President; he also opposed Proclamation No. 1017, which imposed a state of national emergency in the country. The Supreme Court sustained the Senate's stand on the two issues. He was hailed by all as the leading defender of the Senate's independence and of its constitutional duties. Drilon likewise led the Senate in opposing moves by the House of Representatives to amend the Constitution that would supposedly shift the legislature to a unicameral legislature, abolishing the Senate. In 2006, Drilon was succeeded as Senate President by Senator Manny Villar in accordance with a term-sharing agreement they forged in early 2004.

Drilon ran again for the Senate as independent but was under the People Power Coalition senatorial line-up. The lineup was carefully chosen and the first letter of the candidate's surname (except for Roberto Pagdanganan) ended up with the line VOT FOR D CHAMMP. The line became a hit, and it led to the election of most of the coalition's senatorial candidates including Drilon. He again served as Senate President from 2001 to 2006. And from 2006 to the end of his second
term as Senator on 2007, Drilon served as the Chairman of the Senate Committee on Finance and worked firmly for the enactment of the new national budget law on 2007.

Drilon was re-elected to the Philippine Senate in 2010 and was then honored for his 15-year service to the senate (1995-2010). He served as the Assistant Majority Leader and Chairman of the Senate Committee on Finance and led the Senate in enacting the national budget laws on time for 2011, 2012 and 2013. He likewise primarily authored a law that created an oversight body of all government owned and controlled corporations (GOCCs) which would check them from incurring financial excesses and as well as ensuring their financial stability and makes them fiscally responsible. On 2012, after Senator Ralph Recto stepped down as the Chairman of the Senate Committee on Ways and Means, Drilon
as its vice-chairman took over as its new chairman and worked firmly for the enactment of the Sin Tax Law that would impose higher taxes on the cigarettes and liquors. Drilon proudly called it as "anti-cancer law" for he firmly believes that the law would discourage the people from taking cigarettes so that they will not suffer lung cancer.

During the impeachment trial of then Chief Justice Renato Corona in early 2012, he acted as one of the Senator-Judges and later voted for his conviction and removal from office and disqualification from holding any elective or appointive government office.

Halfway through the Presidency of Benigno Aquino III, Drilon won the majority of votes after being voted as Senate President, following the resignation of former Senate President Juan Ponce Enrile. It was predicted long after the resignation of Enrile, that Drilon would have the majority. Enrile was subsequently elected as Minority Leader but was then imprisoned.

Personal life

Drilon was married to fellow lawyer and ACCRA senior partner Violeta Calvo with whom he had two children, Eliza and Patrick. During his candidacy for a Senate seat in 1995, Drilon often traveled to the US to be with his wife who was then being treated for lung cancer. Mrs. Drilon died of the disease in September 1995, two months after her husband assumed his Senate seat. Two years after, Drilon proposed to close family friend Mila Serrano-Genuino, who was a widow. They married with former Presidents Aquino and Ramos as wedding sponsors.

Drilon has a nephew named Rock who is married to ABS-CBN Broadcast Journalist Cecilia Victoria Oreña, also known as Ces Drilon.

Drilon is a member of the Rotary Club, Makati Chapter. He was an active member of the Integrated Bar of the Philippines (IBP) where he was a former President of the Pasay–Makati–Mandaluyong–San Juan Chapter. Although he was born in Iloilo, he is a registered voter of Greenhills, San Juan.

He received his Doctor of Humanities (Honoris Causa) honorary degree from Central Philippine University.

References

External links

Senator Franklin M. Drilon – Senate of the Philippines

|-

|-

|-

|-

|-

|-

|-

1945 births
Living people
Visayan people
Hiligaynon people
People from Iloilo City
Secretaries of Justice of the Philippines
Presidents of the Senate of the Philippines
Majority leaders of the Senate of the Philippines
Senators of the 18th Congress of the Philippines
Senators of the 17th Congress of the Philippines
Senators of the 16th Congress of the Philippines
Senators of the 15th Congress of the Philippines
Senators of the 13th Congress of the Philippines
Senators of the 12th Congress of the Philippines
Senators of the 11th Congress of the Philippines
Senators of the 10th Congress of the Philippines
20th-century Filipino lawyers
Secretaries of Labor and Employment of the Philippines
Executive Secretaries of the Philippines
University of the Philippines alumni
Lakas–CMD (1991) politicians
Liberal Party (Philippines) politicians
People from San Juan, Metro Manila
Independent politicians in the Philippines
Ramos administration cabinet members
Corazon Aquino administration cabinet members
Presidents pro tempore of the Senate of the Philippines
Filipino Roman Catholics
Minority leaders of the Senate of the Philippines
Recipients of the Presidential Medal of Merit (Philippines)